Jannaschia seosinensis is a slightly halophilic bacterium from the genus of Jannaschia which has been isolated from hypersaline water from a solar saltern from Seosin in Korea.

References

External links
Type strain of Jannaschia seosinensis at BacDive -  the Bacterial Diversity Metadatabase

Rhodobacteraceae
Bacteria described in 2006